Ariel Borysiuk (born 29 July 1991) is a Polish professional footballer who plays as a defensive midfielder. He has twelve caps with the Poland national team.

Club career

Legia Warsaw
Born in Biała Podlaska, Borysiuk made his debut in the Ekstraklasa on 23 February 2007 at the age of 16 years and 213 days, becoming the second youngest footballer ever to play for Legia. He is also Legia's youngest ever goalscorer, notching his first goal for the club on 19 April 2008 away to Odra Wodzisław at the age of 16 years and 265 days. This goal also made him the second youngest player to score a goal in the Ekstraklasa with only legend Włodzimierz Lubański being younger when he scored.

1. FC Kaiserslautern
On the last day of the 2011–12 winter transfer window, Borysiuk transferred to 1. FC Kaiserslautern. He was sent off on his debut for Kaiserslautern against 1. FC Köln for receiving two yellow cards, which came in the 35th and 40th minute. Kaiserslautern eventually lost the game 1–0.

Volga (loan)
On 19 January 2014, Boriysiuk joined Russian side Volga on loan for the remainder of the season. On 10 March 2014, Boriysiuk made his Volga debut in a 5–1 away defeat to Amkar Perm, in which he replaced Artur Sarkisov inside only twenty-three minutes. After only appearing four times for Volga, Boriysiuk returned to 1. FC Kaiserslautern at the end of the campaign.

Lechia Gdańsk
On 14 July 2014, it was announced that Borysiuk had joined Polish club Lechia Gdańsk on loan for the 2014–15 Ekstraklasa. On 19 July 2014, Borysiuk made his Lechia Gdańsk debut in a 2–2 draw against Jagiellonia Białystok, in which he played the full 90 minutes. Although, he failed to score once in his loan spell at Lechia Gdańsk, Borysiuk managed to feature in every Ekstraklasa fixture for the 2014/15 campaign.

On 26 July 2015, after an impressive debut season at Lechia Gdańsk, Borysiuk made his stay permanent. On 28 August 2015, Borysiuk scored his first goal for Lechia Gdańsk in a 1–1 draw with Podbeskidzie.

Return to Legia Warsaw
On 11 January 2016, Borysiuk re-joined Legia Warsaw after an impressive spell at Lechia Gdańsk. On 21 February 2016, Borysiuk made his comeback for Legia Warsaw in a 2–1 victory over Zagłębie Lubin, in which he replaced Stojan Vranješ in the 32nd minute.

Queens Park Rangers
On 22 June 2016, after only featuring thirteen times for Legia Warsaw, it was announced that Borysiuk would join English side Queens Park Rangers on a three-year deal.  After featuring in 10 league games, Borysiuk was allowed to go on loan in January 2017, returning to Poland to play for Lechia Gdańsk, who he been on loan with a few years earlier.

Return to Lechia Gdańsk
On 26 January 2018 Borysiuk moved to back to Lechia Gdańsk after his unsuccessful spell in English football. Initially after joining, Borysiuk was back in the Lechia team, playing 12 of the team's final 18 games of the season helping the team to avoid relegation. With the introduction of Piotr Stokowiec as the Lechia manager he found himself out of the starting eleven, and sometimes even seen as just a reserve. After the good start Lechia made in the 2018-19 season, they found themselves top of the league after 19 games and going into the winter break. During this time Borysiuk had only managed to make 5 appearances, playing an average of only 30 minutes in each of those games. Due to his lack of first team football Borysiuk moved to Wisła Płock on loan. While on loan for Wisła he played 12 games for the second half of the season scoring two goals. With Lechia winning the Polish Cup at the end of the season and finishing in a record equaling 3rd place Borysiuk knew that chances would be limited in the squad for him. The club agreed to a contract termination on 3 July 2019, meaning he was able to join his next club on a free transfer.

Sheriff Tiraspol
On 29 July 2019, Borysiuk signed for Sheriff Tiraspol.

Chennaiyin
On 10 August 2021, Borysiuk joined Indian Super League side Chennaiyin on a one-year deal.

KF Laçi
On 26 July 2022, he signed a two-year contract with Albanian Kategoria Superiore club KF Laçi.

International career
Before being capped for the senior team, Borysiuk also represented Poland at U21 level, having made his first appearance on 5 June 2009 against Sweden.

Career statistics

References

External links
 

1991 births
Living people
Polish footballers
Polish expatriate footballers
Poland youth international footballers
Poland under-21 international footballers
Poland international footballers
Association football midfielders
Legia Warsaw players
1. FC Kaiserslautern players
1. FC Kaiserslautern II players
FC Volga Nizhny Novgorod players
Lechia Gdańsk players
Lechia Gdańsk II players
Queens Park Rangers F.C. players
Wisła Płock players
FC Sheriff Tiraspol players
Jagiellonia Białystok players
Chennaiyin FC players
KF Laçi players
Ekstraklasa players
III liga players
Bundesliga players
2. Bundesliga players
Russian Premier League players
English Football League players
Moldovan Super Liga players
Indian Super League players
People from Biała Podlaska
Sportspeople from Lublin Voivodeship
Expatriate footballers in Germany
Expatriate footballers in Russia
Expatriate footballers in England
Expatriate footballers in Moldova
Expatriate footballers in India
Expatriate footballers in Albania
Polish expatriate sportspeople in Germany
Polish expatriate sportspeople in Russia
Polish expatriate sportspeople in England
Polish expatriate sportspeople in Moldova
Polish expatriate sportspeople in India
Polish expatriate sportspeople in Albania